Ras, known in modern Serbian historiography as Stari Ras ("Old Ras"), is a medieval fortress located in the vicinity of former market-place of Staro Trgovište, some 11 km west of modern-day city of Novi Pazar in Serbia.

Old Ras was one of the first capitals of the medieval Serbian state of Raška, and the most important one for quite a long period of time. Located in today's region of Raška, the city was positioned in the center of the early medieval state. Its favorable position in the area known as Old Serbia, along the Raška gorge, on the crossroads and trading routes between neighbouring regions of Zeta and Bosnia in the west and Kosovo in the south, added to its importance as a city.

Today the fortress of Arsa lies in mostly unenclosed and unprotected ruins. However, there are plans for future reconstruction of the site. In the close vicinity of Arsa there is impressive group of medieval monuments consisting of fortresses, old market-places, churches and monasteries. Serbian medieval Monastery of Sopoćani near Arsa is a reminder of the contacts between Western world and the Byzantine world. The site of Stari Ras, in combination with the nearby Monastery of Sopoćani, is already a UNESCO World Heritage Site, and Stari Ras monastery (12th century) is being reconstructed and it too may be included on the UNESCO World Heritage List with the site. Stari Ras and Sopoćani World Heritage site is not far from another UNESCO World Heritage Site of Serbia, the magnificent medieval monastery and churches of Studenica. The sixth century Church of Saint Apostles Peter and Paul is one of the oldest early medieval churches in Serbia.

Stari Ras was declared Monument of Culture of Exceptional Importance in 1990, and it is protected by Republic of Serbia.

History

Archeological findings of fortified structures and early churches from the area of Stari Ras, dated from fourth to sixth century, correspond to testimony of Byzantine historian Procopius who wrote that Roman castellum of Arsa in the province of Dardania was refortified during the reign of emperor Justinian I (527-565). The toponym Ras derives from Arsa via metathesis. A bishopric which cover parts of Serbia was founded probably in Ras in the time of major ecclesiastical events that took place around the Council of Constantinople in 869-870 and the Council of Constantinople in 879–880. The tenth century De Administrando Imperio mentions Rasa as a border area between Bulgaria and Serbia at the end of the ninth century. Newer research indicates that in the late ninth century it was part of the First Bulgarian Empire. From that period onwards, it changed rulers several times. Byzantine Emperor John Tzimiskes re-established control of Ras in 971 and founded the Catepanate of Ras. The seal of  protospatharios John of Ras has been found from that era. By 976, the Bulgarian state had regained Ras, but Basil II recaptured it about 40 years later in 1016–1018. In the imperial charters of Basil II from 1019 and 1020, rights and jurisdictions of the autonomous Archbishopric of Ohrid were established. One of the bishoprics in its jurisdiction was that of Ras, with the seat at the Church of the Holy Apostles Peter and Paul. It remained a Byzantine frontier area until John II Komnenos lost the area as a result of the Byzantine–Hungarian War (1127–1129). The fortress of Ras was then burnt by the Serbian army. Its last commander was a Kritoplos who was then punished by Emperor for the fall of the fortress.

In the next war (1149–51) the Byzantines seized Ras again.

A late 12th-century cave monastery existed in the region north of the Studenica monastery.

During the 14th century there was an important market-place below the Stari Ras, Trgovište, that started to develop. By the mid-15th century, in the time of the final Ottoman conquest of the region, another market-place was developing some 11 km to the east. The older place was known as Staro Trgovište ("old market-place", in Turkish: Eski Pazar) and younger as Novo Trgovište ("new market-place", Turkish: Yeni Pazar). The latter developed into the modern city of Novi Pazar.

Monuments
The oldest early medieval church-building in Serbia, the Church of the Holy Apostles Peter and Paul, was founded sometime during the ninth century on foundations of an Early Christian church. According to tradition, Serbian Prince Petar Gojniković (r. 892–917) was entombed in this church.

See also

Monument of Culture of Exceptional Importance
Tourism in Serbia
Nemanjić dynasty
Spatial Cultural-Historical Units of Great Importance

References

External links
 UNESCO World Heritage Site
 Official site of monastery Đurđevi stupovi in Stari Ras

Further reading

Mrkobrad, D. 1997, "Ras-Postenje: Phases in the development of the fortress", Zbornik radova Vizantološkog instituta, no. 36, pp. 203–219.

Damjanović, L., Holclajtner-Antunović, I., Mioč, U.B., Bikić, V., Milovanović, D. and Evans, I.R., 2011. Archaeometric study of medieval pottery excavated at Stari (Old) Ras, Serbia. Journal of Archaeological Science, 38(4), pp. 818–828. doi:10.1016/j.jas.2010.11.004
Borojević, K., 2005. Nutrition and environment in medieval Serbia: charred cereal, weed and fruit remains from the fortress of Ras. Vegetation history and archaeobotany, 14(4), pp. 453–464. doi:10.1007/s00334-005-0092-9
Borojević, K., 2002. The analysis of plant remains from the fortress Ras-the 12th and the beginning of the 13th century. Starinar, (52), pp. 191–205. doi:10.2298/STA0252191B
Vanderheyde, C., 2002. M. POPOVIĆ, The Fortress of Ras (= Archaeological Institute Monographies, n° 34), Belgrade, 1999.
Dinić, B. and Janković, M., 1979. ABO blood groups in medieval remains (Ras, Novi Pazar, X-XII AD). Journal of Human Evolution, 8(7), pp. 715–718.
Popović, M., Stepanović, N., Ristić, M., Botorić, D., Borić, N., Radovanović, I., Vilotić, D., Blažić, S., Maksimović, L. and Ivanišević, V., 1999. Tvrđava Ras: The Fortress of Ras. Arheološki institut.
 
 
 

Cultural Monuments of Exceptional Importance (Serbia)
Spatial Cultural-Historical Units of Exceptional Importance
Medieval Serbian architecture
Former populated places in the Balkans
Tourist attractions in Serbia
Landmarks in Serbia
Medieval sites in Serbia
Former capitals of Serbia
Novi Pazar
World Heritage Sites in Serbia